The Eugene V. Debs House, on the campus of Indiana State University in Terre Haute, Indiana, was a home of union leader Eugene V. Debs. It was declared a National Historic Landmark in 1966. The museum is maintained by the Eugene V. Debs Foundation, a non-profit educational foundation.

Eugene V. Debs and his wife, Kate, built the two-story frame house in 1890, after their fifth wedding anniversary. Debs was criticized for the house not portraying working-class lifestyle; his wife was a beneficiary of her wealthy aunt's will and could furnish the house affluently. Visitors to Debs' house during his lifetime included friends James Whitcomb Riley and Carl Sandburg; one room in the house to this day is known as the Riley bedroom. When Debs died in 1926, a funeral sermon was given for him at the house, attended by 5000 people.

Original features of the house include the cobalt blue porcelain tile fireplace imported from Italy, the mahogany dining and parlor furniture, and the entire set of Haviland china. The house is also a museum, with many memorabilia of Debs' life and some of his personal library, much of which is across the street at the library of Indiana State University. One room is covered by murals depicting Debs' life.

After Debs' death, the house would see different owners. One was a professor at Indiana State University. It was used as the Theta Chi fraternity house from 1948 to 1961, and briefly was let as apartments. In 1962 the home was bought by the Eugene V. Debs Foundation, which continues to own the house.  In 1965 it was made an official Indiana historic site by the Indiana General Assembly. In 1966 the home was made an official National Historic Landmark of the National Parks system of the Department of the Interior . Today the preservation of the property is monitored by the National Park Service. In 2004 it was removed from threatened status after sufficient repairs to the structure occurred to ensure its permanence.

References

External links

Eugene V. Debs Foundation preserves home and museum within
"Eugene Debs, Presidential Contender" from C-SPAN's The Contenders, broadcast from the Eugene Debs Home

1890s architecture in the United States
Houses in Vigo County, Indiana
National Historic Landmarks in Indiana
National Register of Historic Places in Terre Haute, Indiana
Indiana State Historic Sites
Museums in Vigo County, Indiana
Historic house museums in Indiana
Biographical museums in Indiana
Houses on the National Register of Historic Places in Indiana
Buildings and structures in Terre Haute, Indiana
Tourist attractions in Terre Haute, Indiana
Home